FC Piter Saint Petersburg was a Russian football team from Saint Petersburg. It played in the 2012–13 season of the Russian Second Division and was dissolved after the season due to lack of financing.

Last team squad
As of 27 February 2013, according to the RFS website.

External links
  Official website

Defunct football clubs in Saint Petersburg
2011 establishments in Russia
2013 disestablishments in Russia
Association football clubs established in 2011
Association football clubs disestablished in 2013